Lords, viscounts and then dukes of Uzès, in the Languedoc.

Lords of Uzès (Seigneur d'Uzès)

Viscounts of Uzès (Vicomte d'Uzès)

Dukes of Uzès (Duc d'Uzès)
The viscounty of Uzès became a duchy by letters patent of Charles IX issued at Mont-de-Marsan in May 1565. The dukes were included in the peerage of France from 1572, and if the Kingdom of France existed today, they would rank immediately after the Princes of the Blood.

See also
List of French dukedoms
List of French peerages

References

Uzes